Bill Butler may refer to:

 Bill Butler (Australian footballer) (1920–1986), Australian rules footballer for St Kilda
 Bill Butler (cinematographer) (born 1921), American cinematographer
 Bill Butler (film editor) (1933–2017), English film editor
 Bill Butler (linebacker) (born 1947), American football linebacker
 Bill Butler (outfielder) (1861–1895), Major League Baseball outfielder
 Bill Butler (pitcher) (born 1947), Major League Baseball pitcher
 Bill Butler (politician) (born 1956), Scottish Labour Party politician
 Bill Butler (running back), American football running back; see 1972 New Orleans Saints season
 Bill Butler (safety) (born 1937), American football safety

See also
 Billy Butler (disambiguation)
 William Butler (disambiguation)